Joet De Jesus Gonzalez (born 12 October 1993) is an American professional boxer. He is a two-time world title challenger, having fought for the WBO featherweight title in 2019 and 2021.

Professional boxing career

Early career
Gonzalez made his professional debut against Jesus Carmona on 7 July 2012. He won the fight by unanimous decision. Gonzalez amassed an 18–0 record during the next six years, with eleven stoppage victories, before challenging for his first regional title.

Gonzalez had his first major step-up in competition when faced Rafael Rivera (25–1–2) for the vacant WBO-NABO featherweight title. The bout headlined an ESPN broadcast card, which took place at The Novo in Los Angeles, California. He won the fight by split decision. Two judges scored the fight 97–73 and 96–94 for Gonzalez, while the third judge scored it 96–94 for Rivera. Gonzalez made his first regional title defense against the former IBF super flyweight champion Rodrigo Guerrero on 30 March 2019, on the undercard of the Ángel Acosta and Ganigan Lopez light flyweight title bout. He retained the belt with a fifth-round knockout of Guerrero, after knocking him down in both the first and fourth round.

Gonzalez was booked to face Manuel Avila for the vacant WBA Continental and WBO Global featherweight titles on 13 July 2019. He won the fight by a sixth-round knockout, as Avila's corner decided to throw in the towel at the 2:27 minute mark of the round.

World title fights

Gonzalez vs. Stevenson
On 6 August 2019, the WBO ordered a fight between Gonzalez and the undefeated Shakur Stevenson for the featherweight title, which was left vacant after Óscar Valdez moved up to junior lightweight. The two camps were given a thirty-day period to negotiate the terms of the bout, with Gonzalez being represented by Golden Boy Promotions, with whom he had signed a new promotional deal. The title fight was officially announced on 13 September 2019. It was booked as the event headliner of an ESPN broadcast card, which took place at the Reno-Sparks Convention Center in Reno, Nevada. Gonzalez entered the fight as a +375 underdog, while most odds-makers had Stevenson a -500 favorite. Gonzalez lost the fight by unanimous decision, with all three judges scoring the fight 119–109 for Stevenson and awarding Gonzalez only the seventh round.

Gonzalez vs. Marriaga
Following his failed title bid, Gonzalez was booked to face the former WBO featherweight and junior lightweight title challenger Miguel Marriaga for the WBO Inter-Continental featherweight belt. The bout took place on 12 September 2020, after an eleven-month absence from the sport for Gonzalez, at the MGM Grand in Las Vegas, Nevada. Gonzalez won the fight by unanimous decision, with one judge scoring the fight 97–93 in his favor, while the remaining two judges awarded him a 99–91 scorecard. He called for another chance at the world title in his post-fight interview, stating: "...I want another world title shot. I think I’ve earned it".

Gonzalez vs. Navarrete
On April 27, 2021, it was revealed that Gonzalez was in negotiations with the reigning WBO featherweight champion Emanuel Navarrete. The bout was officially announced on 14 September 2021, as the main event of an ESPN card, which took place at the Pechanga Arena in San Diego, California. Gonzalez was once again the underdog in a world title fight, with most odds-makers having him at +425 and Navarrete as a -650 favorite to retain. He lost the fight by unanimous decision. Two of the judges scored the fight 116–112 for Navarrete, while the third judge scored it 118–110 in his favor. Navarrete landed almost three times as many punches as Gonzalez (272 to 169), and slightly more power punches (204 to 150). He threw 979 punches throughout the twelve round bout, averaging 81.6 punches per round.

Continued featherweight career
Gonzalez faced the one-time WBO super-bantamweight title challenger Jeo Santisima for the vacant WBO International featherweight strap on 4 March 2022. He re-captured his former title by a ninth-round knockout, as referee Edward Collantes stopped the fight at the 2:05 minute mark, following a right straight from Gonzalez which left Santisima badly staggered.

Gonzalez was booked to face the former WBO junior-featherweight champion Isaac Dogboe on 23 July 2022, in the main event of an ESPN+ card, which will take place at the Grand Casino in Hinckley, Minnesota. Aside from being his first WBO International title defense, the bout also served as a WBC featherweight title eliminator. He lost the fight by split decision. Two of the judges scored the fight 96–94 for Dogboe, while the third judge awarded an identical scorecard to Gonzalez.

Professional boxing record

References

1993 births
American male boxers
American boxers of Mexican descent
Super-bantamweight boxers
Featherweight boxers
Living people